The Park of National Awakening (Czech: Park Národního probuzení) is a park located in the Old Town, Prague, Czech Republic. One of its features is Kranner's Fountain.

External links
 

Parks in Prague